Setaq (also Romanized as Sataq; also known as Satagh, Sītāb, and Sī Taq) is a village in Bayat Rural District, Nowbaran District, Saveh County, Markazi Province, Iran. At the 2006 census, its population was 1,488, in 314 families.

References 

Populated places in Saveh County